Raymond Henry Ernest Reeves (12 August 1931 – 30 November 2007) was an English professional footballer who played in the Football League for Reading and Brentford as a left back. He holds legend status amongst the Reading supporters and made 317 appearances for the club. He holds the Reading club record for penalties scored, with 22.

Personal life 
Reeves had three sons. He began his time with Reading as a groundsman and after his retirement from football, became the Co-op dairy's Southern Regional Manager.

Career statistics

References

1931 births
2007 deaths
Sportspeople from Reading, Berkshire
English footballers
England youth international footballers
Association football central defenders
Association football fullbacks
Reading F.C. players
Brentford F.C. players
Dover F.C. players
Burton Albion F.C. players
Rugby Town F.C. players
English Football League players
Southern Football League players
Reading F.C. non-playing staff
Footballers from Berkshire